Raphitoma gabusogana is an extinct species of sea snail, a marine gastropod mollusc in the family Raphitomidae.

Description
The length of the shell reaches 9 mm, its diameter 3.5 mm.

Distribution
Fossils of this extinct marine species were found in Miocene strata on Okinawa

References

 Nomura, Sitihei, and Noboru Zinbô. "Molluscan fossils from the Simaziri beds of Okinawa-zima, Ryukyu Islands." (1936).

gabusogana
Gastropods described in 1936